Telemiades is a genus of Neotropical butterflies in the family Hesperiidae (subfamily Eudaminae).

Species
The following species are recognised in the genus Telemiades:
Telemiades amphion (Geyer, 1832)
T. amphion amphion (Geyer, 1832) - Suriname, Brazil, Venezuela
T. amphion pekahia (Hewitson, 1868) - Venezuela
T. amphion misitheus (Mabille, 1888) - Peru
T. amphion marpesus  (Hewitson, 1876) - Brazil
Telemiades antiope (Plötz, 1882) - Suriname, Peru, Brazil
T. amphion antiope (Plötz, 1882))
T. amphion tosca (Evans, 1953)
Telemiades atlantiope Siewert, Mielke & Casagrande, 2020 - Brazil, Argentina
Telemiades austini Siewert, Mielke & Casagrande, 2020 - Mexico to Panama
Telemiades avitus (Stoll, 1781) - Mexico, Guianas, Suriname, Brazil, Argentina
Telemiades belli Siewert, Mielke & Casagrande, 2020 - Guatemala, Honduras, Nicaragua, Costa Rica, Panama, Colombia
Telemiades brazus Bell, 1949 - Brazil
Telemiades centrites (Hewitson, 1870) - Ecuador
Telemiades choricus (Schaus, 1902) - Mexico
Telemiades chrysorrhoea (Godman & Salvin, 1893) 
Telemiades contra Evans, 1953 - Ecuador 
Telemiades corbulo (Stoll, 1781)
Telemiades cryptus Siewert, Mielke & Casagrande, 2020 - Colombia, Brazil
Telemiades dawkinsi Siewert, Mielke & Casagrande, 2020 - Brazil
Telemiades delalande (Latreille, 1924) - Brazil, Costa Rica
Telemiades epicalus Hübner, 1819 - Suriname, French Guiana, Brazil, Venezuela
Telemiades esmeraldus Siewert, Mielke & Casagrande, 2020 - Ecuador
Telemiades fides Bell, 1949 
Telemiades gallius (Mabille, 1888) - Panama, Colombia
Telemiades lamasi Siewert, Mielke & Casagrande, 2020 - Mexico, El Salvador, Nicaragua, Costa Rica, Panama, Colombia, and Peru
Telemiades laogonus (Hewitson, 1876) - Brazil, Argentina
T. laogonus laogunus (Hewitson, 1876) - Brazil, Argentina
T. laogonus nicola (Plötz, 1882) - Brazil
Telemiades litanicus (Hewitson, 1876) - Brazil
Telemiades megallus Mabille, 1888 - Mexico, Panama, Colombia
Telemiades meris (Plötz, 1886) - Colombia
Telemiades mielkei Siewert & Casagrande, 2020 - Peru
Telemiades moa Siewert, Mielke & Casagrande, 2020 - Brazil
Telemiades nicki Siewert, Mielke & Casagrande, 2021 - Peru
Telemiades nicomedes (Möschler, 1879) - Mexico, Colombia, Brazil, French Guiana
Telemiades oiclus (Mabille, 1889)
Telemiades pallidus Siewert, Mielke & Casagrande, 2020 - Brazil
Telemiades penidas (Hewitson, 1867) - Brazil, Suriname, Peru, Venezuela
Telemiades pseudotrenda Siewert, Mielke & Casagrande, 2020 - Costa Rica
Telemiades quammeni Siewert, Mielke & Casagrande, 2020 - Brazil
Telemiades sila Evans, 1953 - Venezuela
Telemiades squanda Evans, 1953 - Brazil
Telemiades trenda Evans, 1953
Telemiades vansa Evans, 1953 - Guyana
Telemiades vespasius (Fabricius, 1793) - Suriname, Brazil
Telemiades warreni Siewert, Mielke & Casagrande, 2020 - Peru

References

External links
images representing Telemiades at Consortium for the Barcode of Life
Natural History Museum Lepidoptera genus database

Hesperiidae
Butterflies of Central America
Hesperiidae of South America
Butterflies of North America
Lepidoptera of Brazil
Lepidoptera of Colombia
Lepidoptera of Ecuador
Lepidoptera of French Guiana
Lepidoptera of Venezuela
Fauna of the Amazon
Hesperiidae genera
Taxa named by Jacob Hübner